Strabala is a genus of flea beetles in the family Chrysomelidae. There are about 30 described species, found in North America and the Neotropics.

Selected species

 Strabala acuminata Blake, 1953
 Strabala ambulans (Suffrian, 1868)
 Strabala colombiana
 Strabala darcelina
 Strabala peri
 Strabala punctigera
 Strabala rotunda Blake, 1953
 Strabala rufa (Illiger, 1807)
 Strabala scutellaris (Olivier, 1908)
 Strabala supposita
 Strabala uruyenica
 Strabala weyrauchi Bechyne

References

Further reading

 

Alticini
Chrysomelidae genera
Articles created by Qbugbot
Taxa named by Louis Alexandre Auguste Chevrolat